Alick Robinson (17 April 1906 – 1977) was an English professional footballer who played as a wing half.

References

1906 births
1977 deaths
Footballers from Leigh, Greater Manchester
English footballers
Association football wing halves
Burnley F.C. players
Bury F.C. players
Rochdale A.F.C. wartime guest players
English Football League players
English Football League representative players